The death of Kim Jong-il was reported by North Korean state television news on 19 December 2011. The presenter Ri Chun-hee announced that he had died on 17 December at 8:30 am of a massive heart attack while travelling by train to an area outside Pyongyang. Reportedly, he had received medical treatment for cardiac and cerebrovascular diseases, and during the trip, Kim was said to have had an "advanced acute myocardial infarction, complicated with a serious heart shock". However, it was reported in December 2012 by South Korean media that the heart attack had instead occurred in a fit of rage over construction faults in a crucial power plant project at Huichon in Chagang Province.

His son Kim Jong-un was announced as North Korea's next leader with the title of "The Great Successor" during the same newscast. Jong-il's funeral was held on 28 December in Pyongyang, with a mourning period lasting until the following day.

Announcement
North Korean State media did not report Kim Jong-il's death until 51 hours after it occurred, apparently due to the political jockeying and discussions that surrounded the official version of Jong-il's legacy, as well as agreeing upon the membership of the Funeral Committee of Kim Jong-il. On the morning of 19 December, all work units, schools, government agencies, and military personnel were informed of a major announcement to take place at noon. At noon, Ri Chun-hee, a Korean Central Television news anchor, clad in full black traditional Korean clothing, announced the death of Kim Jong-il to a shocked nation. She was the long time announcer of many important news stories during his tenure as Supreme Leader, and was part of the broadcast team that covered Kim Il-sung's state funeral in 1994, as well as a friend of the late Chon Hyong-kyu, a KCTV news presenter who was the one who made the announcement of Kim Il-sung's death 17 years past. During the announcement, a portrait of a smiling, idealized image of Kim Jong-il was released, continuing the tradition of issuing official posthumous portraits of supreme leaders of North Korea after their death.

Following the official notice, a male news anchor wearing a suit and black tie proceeded to announce the entire funeral committee of Kim Jong-il in order of the rankings established by the authorities. The committee had 233 names; Kim Jong-un was ranked first.

Speculation by South Korea
The head of South Korea's National Intelligence Service said surveillance footage revealed that Kim's personal train, on which he is said to have died, did not move over the weekend. This implied that the train was stationary when North Korean authorities claimed he had died. According to editors of The Chosun Ilbo newspaper, it was reported circumstances surrounding Kim's death were inconsistent with what would be generally expected during official business trips: specifically inclement weather conditions were present and the time of day when Kim was supposedly travelling conflicted with his usual circadian rhythm, as Kim was known to be a night owl. Furthermore, a low number of witnesses observed the events.

Reactions

Many countries, organizations, and individuals issued reactions to the death. According to CNN, reactions were "somewhat muted" in comparison to deaths of other world leaders. Just a few countries reacted immediately after Kim's death was announced on North Korea's KCTV. Some countries, like the United States, took the opportunity to comment on their relationship with South Korea. South Korea decided not to offer official condolences, mirroring both worsened relations after the ROKS Cheonan sinking and the bombardment of Yeonpyeong and its position after the death of Kim Il-sung in 1994. The Chinese Foreign Ministry called Kim a "great leader" and added that Beijing would continue to offer its support. Japan expressed condolences and said it hoped Kim's death would not affect the region adversely. Reactions in Europe were "a mix of hope and watchfulness". In North Korea, the official reaction was grief and support for the succession of Kim Jong-un.

Funeral committee
North Korea announced a 232-member funeral committee headed by Kim Jong-un that planned and oversaw Jong-il's funeral, which took place on 28 December. Observers believe the order of names on the list gives clues to the rankings of individuals in the regime's power structure with Kim Jong-un's position on top a further indication that he is Jong-il's successor as supreme leader. According to Kim Keun-sik of Kyungnam University, "The list is in the order of members of the standing committee of the Politburo, then members and candidate members. It shows that the party will be stronger power than the military," because Kim Jong-il's brother-in-law Jang Song-taek or O Kuk-ryol, the vice-chairman of the National Defense Commission, are listed further down."

The National Funeral Committee released the following details on 19 December 2011:

Members
The 232 members of the funeral committee were:

 Kim Jong-un
 Kim Yong-nam
 Choe Yong-rim
 Ri Yong-ho
 Kim Yong-chun
 Jon Pyong-ho
 Kim Kuk-thae
 Kim Ki-nam
 Choe Thae-bok
 Yang Hyong-sop
 Kang Sok-ju
 Pyon Yong-rip
 Ri Yong-mu
 Kim Kyong-hui
 Kim Yang-gon
 Kim Yong-il
 Pak To-chun
 Choe Ryong-hae
 Jang Song-thaek
 Ju Kyu-chang
 Kim Rak-hui
 Thae Jong-su
 Kim Phyong-hae
 Kim Jong-gak
 U Tong-chuk
 Kim Chang-sop
 Mun Kyong-dok
 Ri Thae-nam
 O Kuk-ryol
 Kim Chol-man
 Ri Ul-sol
 Jon Ha-chol
 Kang Nung-su
 Ro Tu-chol
 Jo Pyong-ju
 Han Kwang-bok
 Paek Se-bong
 Ri Yong-su
 Choe Hui-jong
 O Il-jong
 Kim Jong-im
 Chae Hui-jong
 Kim Ki-ryong
 Jang Pyong-gyu
 Kim Pyong-ryul
 Hong In-bom
 Ri Man-gon
 Ju Yong-sik
 Kwak Pom-gi
 O Su-yong
 Ro Pae-gwon
 Pak Thae-dok
 Kim Hi-thaek
 Kang Yang-mo
 Rim Kyong-man
 Kim Kyong-ok
 Kim Myong-guk
 Kim Won-hong
 Hyon Chol-hae
 Han Tong-gun
 Jo Kyong-chol
 Pak Jae-gyong
 Pyon In-son
 Yun Jong-rin
 Jong Myong-do
 Ri Pyong-chol
 Choe Sang-ryo
 Kim Yong-chol
 Kang Phyo-yong
 Kim Hyong-ryong
 Ri Yong-hwan
 Kim Chun-sam
 Choe Kyong-song
 Ri Myong-su
 Jon Hui-jong
 Ri Yong-gil
 Hyon Yong-chol
 Choe Pu-il
 Yang Tong-hun
 Ri Pong-juk
 Kim Song-chol
 Pak Kwang-chol
 Ri Pyong-sam
 Jon Chang-bok
 O Kum-chol
 Kim In-sik
 Kim Song-dok
 Ryo Chun-sok
 Pak Sung-won
 Ri Yong-chol
 Pak Ui-chun
 Kim Hyong-sik
 Kim Thae-bong
 Jon Kil-su
 Ri Mu-yong
 An Jong-su
 Ri Ryong-nam
 Ryu Yong-sop
 Pak Myong-chol
 Kim Yong-jin
 Jang Chol
 Song Ja-rip
 Kim Jong-suk
 Kang Tong-yun
 
 Cha Sung-su
 Ryang Man-gil
 Yun Tong-hyon
 Ko Pyong-hyon
 Ri Pong-dok
 Pak Jong-gun
 Choe Yong-dok
 Jong In-guk
 Jon Ryong-guk
 Ri Hyong-gun
 Hwang Sun-hui
 Paek Kye-ryong
 Kim Tong-il
 Kim Tong-i
 Ri Jae-il
 Pak Pong-ju
 Jong Myong-hak
 Kang Kwan-il
 Hwang Pyong-so
 Kwon Hyok-bong
 Hong Sung-mu
 Kim U-ho
 Han Chang-sun
 Ri Chun-il
 Ri Thae-sop
 Jo Song-hwan
 Tong Yong-il
 Ri Chang-han
 Ko Su-il
 Ri Kuk-jun
 Sin Sung-hun
 Ri Thae-chol
 Yang In-guk
 Ri Hi-su
 Ri Chol
 Hyon Sang-ju
 Ri Myong-gil
 Ro Song-sil
 Tong Jong-ho
 Kang Min-chol
 Kim Hui-yong
 Jo Yong-chol
 Hwang Hak-won
 An Tong-chun
 Paek Ryong-chon
 Hong Kwan-sun
 Ri Su-yong
 Kim Yong-ho
 Pang Ri-sun
 Choe Chun-sik
 Ri Je-son
 Ri Sang-gun
 Ri Hong-sop
 Cha Yong-myong
 Kang Kwan-ju
 Thae Hyong-chol
 Kim Pyong-hun
 Kim Kye-gwan
 Han Chang-nam
 Kim Chang-myong
 Jon Chang-rim
 O Chol-san
 Son Chong-nam
 Jong Un-hak
 Cha Kyong-il
 Kang Ki-sop
 Choi Tae-il
 Choe Yong-do
 Ri Yong-ju
 Jon Kwang-rok
 Ri Chan-hwa
 So Tong-myong
 Jon Song-ung
 Ji Jae-ryong
 Kim Yong-jae
 Ri Yong-ho
 Hong So-hon
 Kim Tong-il
 Kim Tong-un
 Kim Pong-ryong
 Jo Jae-yong
 Choe Chan-gon
 Ryom In-yun
 Kim Chon-ho
 Jang Ho-chan
 Song Kwang-chol
 Ri Ki-su
 Ri Jong-sik
 Choe Hyon
 Jang Myong-hak
 Kang Hyong-bong
 Kim Chung-gol
 Kim Yong-gwang
 Choe Kwan-jun
 Jang Yong-gol
 Kim Myong-sik
 Ho Song-gil
 No Kwang-chol
 Jong Pong-gun
 Pak Chang-bom
 Choe Pong-ho
 Jong Mong-phil
 Jon Kyong-son
 Ri Song-gwon
 Choe Yong
 Kim Thae-mun
 Kim Yong-suk
 Cha Jin-sun
 Ri Min-chol
 Ri Il-nam
 Kim Chang-su
 Pak Myong-sun
 Choe Pae-jin
 Kim Chol
 Sim Chol-ho
 O Ryong-il
 Kye Yong-sam
 Ryu Hyon-sik
 Ko Myong-hui
 Pang Yong-uk
 Jang Jong-ju
 Ho Kwang-uk
 Ji Tong-sik
 Jong Pong-sok
 Choe Kwon-su
 Kim Yong-dae
 Ryu Mi-yong

Lying in state

On 20 December, Jong-il's embalmed body lay in state in a glass coffin at the Kumsusan Memorial Palace, where his father Kim Il-sung is also interred, for an 11-day mourning period prior to the funeral. Like his father, Kim's body was covered in a red flag and surrounded by blossoms of his namesake flowers, red kimjongilia. It is expected that the body will be placed next to his father's bier following the funeral and mourning period. As solemn music played, Kim Jong-un entered the hall to view his father's bier, surrounded by military honour guards. He observed a moment of solemn silence, then circled the bier, followed by other officials.

On Saturday 24 December Kim Jong-un made a third visit to the palace where his father's body is lying in state. At this broadcast, Jang Sung-taek, whom South Korean intelligence assumed would play larger roles supporting the heir, stood with military uniform near young Kim, who wept this time, as he paid respects to Kim Jong-il's body lying in state.

Funeral and memorial service

The funeral itself occurred on 28 December. The , 3-hour funeral procession was covered in snow (which local newscasters described as "heaven's tears") as soldiers beat their chests and called out "Father, Father." A Lincoln Continental limousine carried a giant portrait of Jong-il. Jong-il's casket, draped by the Korean Workers' Party flag, was carried on top of another Lincoln Continental hearse while Kim Jong-un and his uncle Jang Sung-taek were immediately behind. Army chief of the general staff Ri Yong-ho and defence minister Vice-Marshal Kim Yong-chun walked along the opposite side of the vehicle during the procession segments in the Kumsusan Memorial Palace. The procession returned to Kumsusan Palace where Jong-un stood flanked by the top party and military officials who are expected to be his inner circle of advisers as rifles fired 21 times, then saluted again as goose-stepping soldiers carrying flags and rifles marched by the palace square. Reportedly, Jong-il's body will be embalmed and put on display indefinitely in the manner of Kim Il-sung and other Communist leaders such as Lenin, Mao, and Ho Chi Minh.

The convoy during the funeral procession was composed of lead patrol cars, the funeral hearse and its escorts, military escorts, motorised colour guards, an OB van of Korean Central Television, various cars (including a fleet of black Mercedes), and trucks carrying wreaths and five military bands from the KPA.

On the day of the memorial service, 29 December, Chairman of the Presidium, Kim Yong-nam, gave an address to mourners gathered in Kim Il-sung Square.

Kim Young-nam told mourners that "The great heart of comrade Kim Jong-il has ceased to beat... such an unexpected and early departure from us is the biggest and the most unimaginable loss to our party and the revolution," and that North Korea would "transform the sorrow into strength and courage 1,000 times greater under the leadership of comrade Kim Jong-un."

The chairman also affirmed Kim Jong-un's position as his father's successor saying "Respected Comrade Kim Jong-un is our party, military and country's supreme leader who inherits great comrade Kim Jong-il's ideology, leadership, character, virtues, grit and courage".

General Kim Jong-gak addressing the memorial service on behalf of the military, saying "Our people's military will serve comrade Kim Jong-un at the head of our revolutionary troops and will continue to maintain and complete the Songun accomplishments of great leader Kim Jong-il". Songun refers to Kim Jong-il's policy of prioritising the "military first" in economic decisions.

Kim Jong-un did not make an address but stood with his head bowed, watching from a balcony of the Grand People's Study House, overlooking the square. He was flanked by his aunt, Kim Kyong-hui, her husband, Jang Sung-taek, and senior party and military officials.

After the speeches, and a nationwide observance of three-minute silence, a row of heavy artillery guns were fired off in a 21-gun salute followed by a cacophony of sirens, horns and whistles sounded off simultaneously from trains and ships across the country to mark the end of the mourning period. The assembly concluded with a military band playing The Internationale. State television then broadcast a military choir and wind band performing The Song of General Kim Jong Il to formally conclude.

Kim Jong-un's elder brothers, Kim Jong-nam and Kim Jong-chol, are not known to have been in attendance either at the lying in state or on either date, the funeral or the memorial service.

The funeral showcased seven officials who are believed to be mentors or major aides to Kim Jong-un: Jang Song-taek, Mr. Kim's uncle and a vice-chairman of the National Defense Commission; Kim Ki-nam, North Korea's propaganda chief; Choe Tae-bok, the party secretary in charge of external affairs; Vice Marshal Ri Yong-ho, head of the military's general staff; Kim Yong-chun, the defence minister; Kim Jong-gak, a four-star general whose job is to monitor the allegiance of other generals; and U Dong-chuk, head of the North's secret police and spy agency.

On 1 January 2012 the Japanese daily Yomiuri Shimbun reported that Kim Jong-nam secretly flew to Pyongyang from Macau on 17 December 2011, after learning about his father's death that day and is presumed to have accompanied Kim Jong-un when paying his last respects to their father. He left after a few days to return to Macau and was not in attendance at the funeral in order to avoid speculation about the succession.

According to Daily NK, anyone who did not participate in the organised mourning sessions or did not seem genuine enough in their sorrow has been sentenced to at least six months in a labour camp. Mourners were also barred from wearing hats, gloves or scarves even though the temperature that day was —presumably so authorities could check to make sure they were displaying sufficient grief. North Korea angrily denied this accusation, blaming it on "reptile media" in the pay of the South Korean government. A photo slideshow from The Los Angeles Times does show multiple mourners with gloves and scarves.

Reports of mourning

The Korean Central News Agency (KCNA) claimed that strange natural phenomena occurred in North Korea around the time of Kim Jong-il's death. In the past, the North Korean government has been known to encourage stories of miraculous deeds and supernatural events credited to Kim Il-sung and Kim Jong-il. KCNA also claimed that more than five million North Koreans, more than 25% of the national population, had shown up to mourn Kim Jong-il.

See also
 Death and state funeral of Kim Il-sung

References

External links
 Chronological coverage at North Korean Economy Watch
 Route of the funeral procession at North Korean Economy Watch

2011 in North Korea
History of the Workers' Party of Korea
Kim, Jong-il
Death
Kim, Jong-il
Kim, Jong-il
21st century in Pyongyang
December 2011 events in Asia